Theophanes Continuatus or Scriptores post Theophanem ("those after Theophanes") is the Latin name commonly applied to a collection of historical writings preserved in the 11th-century Vat. gr. 167 manuscript. Its name derives from its role as the continuation, covering the years 813–961, of the chronicle of Theophanes the Confessor, which reaches from 285 to 813. The manuscript consists of four distinct works, in style and form very unlike the annalistic approach of Theophanes.

The first work, of four books consists of a series of biographies of the emperors reigning from 813 to 867 (from Leo the Armenian to Michael III). As they were commissioned by Emperor Constantine VII (r. 913–959), they reflect the point of view of the reigning Macedonian dynasty. The unknown author probably used the same sources as Genesios. The second work is known as the Vita Basilii (Latin for "Life of Basil"), a biography of Basil I the Macedonian (r. 867–886) written by his grandson Constantine VII probably around 950. The work is essentially a panegyric, praising Basil and his reign while vilifying his predecessor, Michael III. The third work is a history of the years 886–948, in form and content very close to the history of Symeon Logothetes, and the final section continues it until 961. It was probably written by Theodore Daphnopates, shortly before 963.


References

Citations

Sources

Further reading 
 Chronographiae Quae Theophanis Continuati Nomine Fertur Liber Quo Vita Basilii Imperatoris Amplectitur, edited & translated into English by I. Ševčenko (CFHB 42, Berlin, 2011). Life of Basil I, Greek and English on facing pages. 
 Chronographiae Quae Theophanis Continuati Nomine Fertur Libri I-IV : recensuerunt anglice verterunt indicibus instruxerunt Michael Featherstone et Juan Signes-Codoñer, nuper repertis schedis Caroli de Boor adiuvantibus (CFHB 53, Berlin, 2015.) Books I-IV, Greek and English on facing pages; commentary and notes in English and Latin 
 Codoñer, J. Signes. El periodo del Segundo Iconoclasmo en Theophanes Continuatus. Amsterdam, 1995.
 Yannopoulos, P. "Les vicissitudes historiques de la Chronique de Théophane." Byzantion 70 (2000). pp. 527–53.

External links 
 Theophanes continuatus, Joannes Cameniata, Symeon Magister, Georgius Monachus... ex recognitione Immanuelis Bekkeri, E. Weber, Bonn, 1838.
 Paul Stephenson, Theophanes Continuatus

10th-century Byzantine historians